The Red Arrow (German: Roter Pfeil, French: Flèche rouge, Italian: Freccia rossa) were railcars built in the 1930s by the Swiss Federal Railways (SBB). They were intended for traffic on lines with a low volume of traffic, following the global economic crisis of 1928. With increasing demand, the railcars had to be replaced by light express trains. Capable of speeds up to 150km/h, the double Red Arrow Re 4/8 301 was presented at the 1939 Swiss National Exhibition to showcase Swiss workmanship. In 1946 Swiss businessmen invited Winston Churchill into painting holidays at the shores of Lake Geneva for which the Red Arrow was provided for his use. With the train Churchill visited several cities like Bern or Zurich where he held an inspiring speech. Since the train was also known as the Churchill Arrow. It was strongly damaged in a fire in 1979 after which it was sold.  in 1996 the train was repaired and came into service of the Mittelthurgau railways until they went bankrupt. In 2002 the train returned to the SBB. A few Red Arrows are still occasionally operated by SBB Historic.

See also
List of heritage railways and funiculars in Switzerland

References

External links

Swiss Federal Railways
Railcars of Switzerland
Rolling stock of Switzerland